The Countess of Corfu is a 1972 film starring Rena Vlahopoulou, Alekos Alexandrakis and Nonika Galinea. The movie was filmed in Corfu, the birthplace of Rena Vlahopoulou.

Plot 
Rena Vlahopoulou plays signora Antzolina, an old-time Corfiote aristocratic lady who has fallen on hard times and is working as a piano teacher while reminiscing of her old romance with her lost fiancé. She lives in her palatial mansion in Corfu which becomes the object of desire of Sotiris Karelis, an entrepreneur, who wants to convert it into a hotel. Karelis romances the old aristocrat thinking that at a suitable price she will eventually agree to sell her mansion to him. When she resists, he tells her a story that he is friends with her lost fiancé.

An Italian musical group arrives in Corfu and she accommodates them in her mansion. Her hospitality extends to also helping the Italian musicians by replacing their lead singer Alinda Ritsi who has left the group. However Alinda changes her mind and arrives in Corfu intent on joining the group once more. Comedy ensues when the identities of the two singers get all mixed up and when the lost fiancé of Antzolina turns out to be the escort of the Italian singer.

The movie was filmed during the Papadopoulos dictatorship years and this is reflected in the film by the characters being closely followed by policemen who watch them. In the end love and fun prevail and Sotiris falls for Antzolina.

Music
The theme song of the film makes mention of many Corfu landmarks such as Benitses, the Spianada, Palaiokastritsa and Pontikonisi. Angelos Sakellarios wrote the lyrics of the theme song but he obtained advice from the Corfiotes in the film like Giorgos Katsaros and the star Rena Vlahopoulou who guided him regarding the places that were to be included in the song. The song became a classic of "tourist folk".

Locale
The film showcased the cantounia of the old city of Corfu, the Achilleion, luxury hotels and famous beaches of the island like Palaiokastritsa which became the background of elaborate dance routines by the veteran Greek dance group of the 70s led by Fotis Metaxopoulos and his partner Nadia Fontana.

Box office
The movie was the ninth most popular Greek film of 1972 with 310,583 tickets.

Cast 
Rena Vlahopoulou ..... Angolina
Alekos Alexandrakis ..... Sotiris Karelis
Nonika Galinea ..... Froso
Makis Demiris ..... Kostas
Vangelis Ploios
Orfeas Zahos ..... Pipis Karetas
Manolis Destounis ..... Gerasimos
Alekos Sakellarios ..... Dimitris

Release 
The film premiered in Greece on 7 February 1972.

References

External links

1972 comedy films
1972 films
Greek comedy films
Corfu
Finos Film films
Films shot in Corfu
Films set in Corfu
Films set in Greece
1970s Greek-language films